DLP may refer to:

Politics
 Democratic Left Party (Turkey), a political party from Turkey
 Democratic Labour Party (Australia), an Australian political party
 Democratic Labour Party (Barbados), a major political party in Barbados
 Democratic Labour Party (New Zealand), a former New Zealand political party
 Democratic Labour Party (Trinidad and Tobago), a political party in Trinidad and Tobago 
 Dominica Labour Party, a social democratic political party in Dominica
 Dominion Labor Party (Alberta)
 Dominion Labour Party (Manitoba)
 Dutch Labour Party, in the Netherlands
 Jammu Kashmir Democratic Liberation Party, a political party in Jammu Kashmir

Science and technology
 Data level parallelism, a form of data parallelism in computer science
 Data loss prevention, a field of computer security; See Data loss prevention software
 Digital Light Processing, a display device based on optical micro-electro-mechanical technology
 Discrete logarithm problem, a mathematical problem with applications to cryptography
 Document Liberation Project, a project of The Document Foundation

 Dose-length product, a CT scan radiation dose
 Deep Learning Processor, an electronic circuit designed for deep learning algorithms

Other uses
 Delta Lambda Phi, the name of a social fraternity for gay, bisexual, and progressive men
 Disneyland Paris
 Deep-lying playmaker, a position and role in association football (soccer)
 Dyslipidemia, medical disorder of lipid metabolism which leads to increased risk of cardiovascular disease

See also
 Democratic Labour Party (disambiguation)